Avizo may refer to:

 Avizo (software), 3D visualization and analysis software 
 Avizo (magazine), Slovakia's daily advertising magazine, published by Northcliffe Media